Paul Richard Bentley (born 25 July 1942) is a British stage, film and television actor, perhaps best known for playing the High Septon in the television series Game of Thrones. He is also a writer.

Early life 
Bentley was born in Sheffield and brought up in Surrey. He attended Wimbledon College, a Jesuit grammar school, and Kingston Polytechnic. He then attended Birmingham University, achieving a BA in English literature and an MA in Drama and Theatre Arts. His M.A. dissertation, on the stage history of Wagner's Parsifal, involved a research visit to the Wagner Festival Theatre at Bayreuth, Germany.

Career 
After university Bentley moved to Munich, hoping to become an opera director. He began acting in English programmes on the Bavarian radio station Bayerischer Rundfunk. He also appeared in the film The Last Escape, in which he played a British spy in Bavaria in World War Two.

He returned to England in 1970 and continued acting, mainly in repertory theatre, at venues including the Byre Theatre at St. Andrews, the Leicester Haymarket Theatre, the Duke's Playhouse at Lancaster, and the Newcastle Playhouse.

In 1973 Bentley wrote the book and lyrics for Shylock, a musical version of The Merchant of Venice, performed at the 1974 Edinburgh Festival. He played the title role; the composer and director was Roger Haines. Shylock won a Scotsman Fringe First Award. In 1977 an updated version called Fire Angel, set in a 20th century New York City Mafia nightclub, appeared at Her Majesty's Theatre, London. Bentley was the alternate leading man, his first West End part. A revised version of the original Shylock was produced at the Leicester Haymarket Studio Theatre in 1981 and at the Manchester Library Theatre in 1982. Bentley again played the title role and Haines directed both productions.

Bentley's second West End show was in Tommy Steele's Singin' In The Rain at the London Palladium. In 1985 he went to Dublin to play Captain Corcoran in H.M.S. Pinafore, which transferred to the Old Vic in 1986 and for which Bentley was nominated for an Olivier Award for the Outstanding Performance of the Year by an Actor in a Musical. This success led to four back-to-back West End shows lasting five years: Lend Me A Tenor, Follies, Cats and Aspects of Love. Next came an off-West-End Assassins followed by a national tour of Aspects of Love, then Phantom of the Opera in Manchester and back to London for Company, Kiss Me Kate and Dame Edna – the Spectacle. Bentley has other radio, television and film credits but most of his work has been in theatre.

In 1994 Bentley was asked by the Danish composer Poul Ruders to write the libretto for his opera The Handmaid's Tale based on Margaret Atwood's novel, which won a Cannes Classical Award and Reumert Prize. In A Handmaid's Diary, Bentley tells the story of the opera from the first phone call to the first night (directed by Phyllida Lloyd). Ruders' and Bentley's second opera was Kafka's Trial. Librettos for three other composers followed: Ana Sokolovic's The Midnight Court, Dominique Le Gendre's Bird of Night and James Rolfe's Inês.

Bentley has also written a novel, The Man Who Came After Hyacinth Bobo, about the Fourth Crusade and the Siege of Constantinople, published in Greek and English, plus occasional newspaper and magazine articles. Bentley's latest works include Inquisition, a play about the famous Jesuit scientist Teilhard de Chardin, and a radio play in which Jane Austen meets Lord Byron.

Personal life 
Paul Bentley married Annie Healey in 1979. They met at the Byre Theatre, St. Andrews, where Annie was an assistant stage manager. They have two daughters, Emma and Rebecca, who both work in the theatre. Bentley's sister, the novelist Ursula Bentley, died in 2004.

Bentley took part in Mastermind on BBC TV (15 March 1992) where his specialist subject was The Life and Works of King Ludwig II of Bavaria. He lost in this first round with a score of 29.

He is a member of the Wagner Society and the Society for the Promotion of Byzantine Studies. He was the Founder Chairman of the British Association for Modern Mosaic from 1999 to 2005 and remains a member. He is the editor of the website Mosaic Matters, a website about mosaics, and he also edits the British Teilhard Network.

Awards and nominations

Stage and screen credits

Theatre

Television

Film

Radio

Recordings as singer

Recordings as librettist

Operas as librettist 
The Handmaid's Tale – composer Poul Ruders, director John Fulljames – Royal Danish Opera, Copenhagen, 2022
The Handmaid's Tale – composer Poul Ruders, director Annilese Miskimmon – English National Opera, London, 2022
The Handmaid’s Tale – composer Poul Ruders, director Anne Bogart – Boston Lyric Opera, Boston, 2019
The Handmaid’s Tale – composer Poul Ruders, director Linda Thompson – Gertrude Opera, Yarra Valley Opera Festival, Melbourne, 2018
Ines – composer James Rolfe, director Jennifer Tarver – Queen of Puddings Music Theatre, Enwave Theatre, Toronto, 2009
 Bird of Night – composer Dominique Le Gendre, director Irina Brown – Royal Opera Covent Garden, Linbury Studio, London, 2006
 The Midnight Court – composer Ana Sokolovic, director Michael Cavanagh – Queen of Puddings Music Theatre, Harbourfront Centre, Toronto 2005; Royal Opera Covent Garden, Linbury Studio, London, 2006
 Kafka's Trial – composer Poul Ruders, director Francisco Negrin – Opera House, Copenhagen, 2005
 The Handmaid's Tale – composer Poul Ruders, director Eric Simonson – Minnesota Opera, Minneapolis, 2003
 The Handmaid's Tale – composer Poul Ruders, director Phyllida Lloyd – Royal Danish Opera, Copenhagen, 2000; English National Opera, London, 2003; Canadian Opera Company, Toronto, 2004

Bibliography 
A playwright's quest for a missing Pierre Teilhard de Chardin file, The Christian Century, 10 July 2018
The Sixth Proposition, The Tablet, 2 June 2018
Teilhard de Chardin, Original Sin, and The Six Propositions, with David Grumett, Zygon, 16 April 2018
The Mosaicing of Westminster Cathedral, in New Light on Old Glass, British Museum 2013
 The Man Who Came After Hyacinth Bobo, Fourth Crusade novel, Amazon 2011
 Ines, libretto based on the Inês de Castro legend, 2009
 Bird of Night, libretto set in Trinidad, 2006
 Thrills not theology, article on The Da Vinci Code for the Daily Telegraph, 6 May 2006
 Kafka the comedian, article for the Daily Telegraph, 28 February 2005
 The Midnight Court, libretto based on the poem by Brian Merriman, 2005
 What Islam took from Byzantium, article for the Catholic Herald, 14 May 2004
 A Handmaid's Diary, how The Handmaid's Tale became an opera, Wilhelm Hansen 2004
 Ο άνθρωπος που διαδέχθηκε τον Υάκινθο Βωβό, Fourth Crusade novel, Enalios 2004
 Lost for Words, article on Berlioz and Wagner, Opera Now, Jan/Feb 2003
 The Handmaid's Tale vocal score, Wilhelm Hansen 2002
 Time to cover a ton of bricks, article for the Daily Telegraph, 24 July 1999

References

External links 

Rogues and Vagabonds interview 2002
Daily Telegraph interview 2003

21st-century English male actors
20th-century English male actors
1942 births
Living people
Male actors from Sheffield
20th-century English singers
English male musical theatre actors
English male television actors
20th-century British male singers